In statistics, quantile normalization is a technique for making two distributions identical in statistical properties.  To quantile-normalize a test distribution to a reference distribution of the same length, sort the test distribution and sort the reference distribution. The highest entry in the test distribution then takes the value of the highest entry in the reference distribution, the next highest entry in the reference distribution, and so on, until the test distribution is a perturbation of the reference distribution.

To quantile normalize two or more distributions to each other, without a reference distribution, sort as before, then set to the average (usually, arithmetic mean) of the distributions. So the highest value in all cases becomes the mean of the highest values, the second highest value becomes the mean of the second highest values, and so on.
 
Generally a reference distribution will be one of the standard statistical distributions such as the Gaussian distribution or the Poisson distribution. The reference distribution can be generated randomly or from taking regular samples from the cumulative distribution function of the distribution. However, any reference distribution can be used.

Quantile normalization is frequently used in microarray data analysis. It was introduced as quantile standardization and then renamed as quantile normalization.

Example

A quick illustration of such normalizing on a very small dataset:

Arrays 1 to 3, genes A to D

 A    5    4    3
 B    2    1    4
 C    3    4    6
 D    4    2    8

For each column determine a rank from lowest to highest and assign number i-iv

 A    iv    iii   i
 B    i     i     ii
 C    ii    iii   iii
 D    iii   ii    iv

These rank values are set aside to use later.
Go back to the first set of data. Rearrange that first set of column values so each column is in order going lowest to highest value. (First column consists of 5,2,3,4. This is rearranged to 2,3,4,5. Second Column 4,1,4,2 is rearranged to 1,2,4,4, and column 3 consisting of 3,4,6,8 stays the same because it is already in order from lowest to highest value.) The result is:

 A    5    4    3    becomes A 2 1 3
 B    2    1    4    becomes B 3 2 4
 C    3    4    6    becomes C 4 4 6
 D    4    2    8    becomes D 5 4 8

Now find the mean for each row to determine the ranks

 A (2 + 1 + 3)/3 = 2.00 = rank i
 B (3 + 2 + 4)/3 = 3.00 = rank ii
 C (4 + 4 + 6)/3 = 4.67 = rank iii
 D (5 + 4 + 8)/3 = 5.67 = rank iv

Now take the ranking order and substitute in new values

 A    iv    iii   i
 B    i     i     ii
 C    ii    iii   iii
 D    iii   ii    iv

becomes:

 A    5.67    4.67    2.00
 B    2.00    2.00    3.00
 C    3.00    4.67    4.67
 D    4.67    3.00    5.67

These are the new normalized values. 

However, note that when, as in column two, values are tied in rank, they should instead be assigned the mean of the values corresponding to the ranks they would normally represent if they were different. In the case of column 2, they represent ranks iii and iv.  So we assign the two tied rank iii entries the mean of 4.67 for rank iii and 5.67 for rank iv, which is 5.17. And so we arrive at the following set of normalized values:

 A    5.67    5.17    2.00
 B    2.00    2.00    3.00
 C    3.00    5.17    4.67
 D    4.67    3.00    5.67

The new values have the same distribution and can now be easily compared.  Here are the summary statistics for each of the three columns:

 Min.   :2.000   Min.   :2.000   Min.   :2.000  
 1st Qu.:2.750   1st Qu.:2.750   1st Qu.:2.750  
 Median :3.833   Median :4.083   Median :3.833  
 Mean   :3.833   Mean   :3.833   Mean   :3.833  
 3rd Qu.:4.917   3rd Qu.:5.167   3rd Qu.:4.917  
 Max.   :5.667   Max.   :5.167   Max.   :5.667

References

External links
 Normalization of Affymetrix Chips

Statistical data transformation
Equivalence (mathematics)